Rivlin is a primarily Jewish family with origins in Austria and Eastern Europe, which became established in early 19th century Palestine (now Israel). There are also branches of the family in several other countries.

The family
The Rivlin family originated in Vienna, Austria and has over 50,000 members. The name Rivlin was derived from the descriptive name of a prominent Torah scholar called Moshe "Rivkes" or "Rivkesh" (b. circa 1600), i.e., Moshe “of Rivka” (Rebecca). This ancestor was author of the commentary Be'er HaGolah on the Shulchan Aruch (Code of Jewish Law). The name Rivkesh led to Riveles, and that led to Rivlin. The first Rivlin to go to what is now Israel (then an Ottoman province) was Hillel Rivlin, who immigrated in 1809 to Jerusalem. In the following years, many more Rivlins arrived in the country. The Rivlins are now one of the oldest and largest Ashkenazi families in Israel.

Diaspora
The Rivlin family has established itself in various large cities throughout the world. The diaspora occurred in the mid-19th century and early 20th century. Members of the Rivlin family can now be found in most major cities of the United States, Paris, Leeds, London, Rio de Janeiro, parts of Mexico, Australia, Norway, Ireland and South Africa.

Reunions
The Rivlin family has held major reunions in Jerusalem in 1980 and 2009. These reunions drew thousands of family members to Jerusalem. A film, The Tribe, was made about the 1980 reunion by Lilly Rivlin.

Notable Rivlins
Chronologically:
 Hillel Rivlin (1758–1838), rabbi and student of the Vilna Gaon, revitalized the Ashkenazi community in Palestine
 Yosef Rivlin (1836–1896), rabbi and secretary of the Jerusalem-based Central Committee of Knesseth Israel under Jerusalem Chief Rabbi Shmuel Salant
 Yosef Yoel Rivlin (1889–1971), Oriental studies scholar, Hebrew U. professor and translator
 Ronald Rivlin (1915–2005), Anglo-American physicist, developer of the Mooney-Rivlin model for calculating the mechanical behaviour of rubber and similar materials
 Jule Rivlin (1917–2002), American college men's basketball coach and professional basketball player
 Theodore J. Rivlin (1926–2006), American mathematician
 Leanne Rivlin (born 1929), an originator of the Environmental Psychology Doctoral Program at the CUNY Graduate Center, USA
 Alice Rivlin (1931–2019), American economist and budget official
 Lilly Rivlin, (born 1936), Israeli filmmaker
 Reuven Rivlin (born 1939), President of Israel
 Nechama Rivlin (1945–2019), First Lady of Israel
 Eliezer Rivlin (1942–2013), deputy-president of the Supreme Court of Israel and chairman of the Central Elections Committee
 Avraham Rivlin (born 1946), former mashgiach at Yeshivat Kerem B’Yavneh 
 Sefi Rivlin (1947–2013), Israeli actor and comedian
 Gary Rivlin (born 1958), American journalist and author
 Michal Rivlin-Etzion, Israeli neuroscientist (graduated from the Hebrew University in 2001)
 Yermi Kaplan (born 1961), son of Orah Rivlin Kaplan; Israeli singer and musician

Notes

Jewish surnames
Slavic-language surnames
Jewish families
Israeli families
Yiddish-language surnames
Families from Jerusalem